Northern State may refer to:
Northern State (band), a female rap group from New York City
The Northern State Parkway, a limited-access parkway located on Long Island
Northern, Sudan, one of 18 states in Sudan
Northern State University, a four-year public institution in Aberdeen, South Dakota

The plural Northern States may refer to:
Northern United States, states typically as specified by the United States Census Bureau
In a historic context, the Union states that did not secede during the American Civil War